Utricularia welwitschii is a small to medium-sized, probably perennial, carnivorous plant that belongs to the genus Utricularia. It is endemic to tropical Africa, where it can be found in the Democratic Republic of the Congo, Madagascar, Malawi, South Africa, Tanzania, Zambia, and Zimbabwe. It was originally described and published by Daniel Oliver in 1865. Taylor previously described two varieties of U. welwitschii, U. welwitschii var. odontosepala and U. welwitschii var. microcalyx, in 1964, but later elevated them to the rank of species as U. odontosepala and U. microcalyx, respectively. It is named in honor of Friedrich Welwitsch.

See also 
 List of Utricularia species

References 

Carnivorous plants of Africa
Flora of Madagascar
Flora of Malawi
Flora of South Africa
Flora of Tanzania
Flora of the Democratic Republic of the Congo
Flora of Zambia
Flora of Zimbabwe
welwitschii
Taxa named by Daniel Oliver